The shovelnose sea catfish (Arius subrostratus), also called the short-nosed catfish or the marine catfish, is a species of sea catfish in the family Ariidae. It was described by Achille Valenciennes in 1840. It is a non-migratory species which inhabits tropical marine and brackish waters in the Indo-western Pacific region, including Indonesia, India, Pakistan, the Philippines and Thailand.

The diet of the shovelnose sea catfish includes detritus, polychaete worms, diatoms, algal weeds, and various crustaceans. It has been recorded spawning between the months of January–April and September–October in India. Males incubate the eggs in their mouths.

The shovelnose sea catfish is of commercial value to fisheries; it is mostly marketed fresh.

References

Arius (fish)
Catfish of Africa
Catfish of Asia
Catfish of Oceania
Fish of the Pacific Ocean
Fish of the Red Sea
Marine fish of Africa
Marine fish of Asia
Marine fauna of Southeast Asia
Fish of Australia
Fish of Bangladesh
Fish of India
Fish of Indonesia
Fish of New Guinea
Fish of Sri Lanka
Fish of Thailand
Fish of the Philippines

Taxa named by Achille Valenciennes
Fish described in 1840